Clinton Earl Wolgamot (December 21, 1892 – April 25, 1970) was an American professional baseball catcher, coach and manager.

Wolgamot began his playing career in 1915, became a player-manager in 1929 in the minors, and appeared in his last games in 1938 at age 45. Though statistical information is incomplete, it is known that he played in at least 909 games and collected at least 716 career hits. As well, he hit at least 36 home runs, 144 doubles and 27 triples.

He began his managerial career by skippering the 1929 Terre Haute Tots through 1930. As a coach in Cleveland, he worked under managers Roger Peckinpaugh and Baseball Hall of Famer Walter Johnson. In 1934, he managed for the Grand Rapids Tigers, Monessen Indians and Zanesville Grays. After taking over the Grays partway through the season, he led them to a league championship. He managed the Grays until 1936, leading them to another league championship in his final year with the team. He moved onto the Springfield Indians in 1937 and managed them until 1939, leading them to the playoffs each year. From 1940 to 1942, he managed the Wilkes-Barre Barons, leading them to the playoffs twice. In 1943 he managed the Batavia Clippers, in 1944 and 1945 he managed the Springfield Giants (leading them to the playoffs both times), in 1947 he managed the Trenton Giants and in 1948 he managed the Fort Smith Giants. 

From 1939 through 1941, he managed future Hall of Fame pitcher Bob Lemon at Springfield and Wilkes-Barre, while Lemon was still an infielder; he converted to full-time pitching with Cleveland after World War II.

References

External links
Retosheet

1892 births
1970 deaths
Baseball coaches from Iowa
Baseball players from Iowa
Cleveland Indians coaches
Edmonton Eskimos (baseball) players
Fort Worth Panthers players
Galveston Sand Crabs players
Ionia Mayors players
Kalamazoo Celery Pickers players
Minor league baseball managers
Monessen Indians players
People from Independence, Iowa
Rockford Wakes players
San Antonio Bronchos players
Springfield Indians (baseball) players
Terre Haute Tots players
Toledo Mud Hens players
Waco Cubs players
Zanesville Greys players
Springfield Giants (Ohio) players